Sir William Alison Russell, KCMG (1875–1948), known as Sir Alison Russell was a Scottish lawyer who served in the British Colonial Legal Service as an attorney and judge.

Personal life

William Alison Russell was born in 1875, the son of George Russell, an engineer.
His cousin was the Australian artist John Russell.
Another relative and close friend was the Australian painter Thea Proctor.
He attended Rugby School.
In his private life Russell was active in sailing and skating.
He was interested in contemporary literature, painted watercolors and was an excellent musician.
He became a barrister-at-law.

Career

Alison Russell served in various legal positions in the British Colonial offices in Africa, the Mediterranean and the West Indies.

Uganda

On 21 March 1907 Henry Hesketh Bell, His Majesty's Commissioner in Uganda, conferred on William Alison Russell of Entebbe the power of administering oaths in all cases in which he was concerned as Administrator-General, Curator in Lunacy or Receiver in Bankruptcy.
In 1910 Russell was Attorney-General in Uganda.
In November 1910 he was Acting Chief Secretary to the Uganda government and prepared a report of the Uganda Blue Book for the 1909–10 financial year.

Cyprus

Alison Russell was King's Advocate in Cyprus from 1912 to 1924.
This office had formerly been called "Legal Advisor of the Government", but the responsibilities were steady increased, and in 1925 the title was changed to "Attorney General".
In this role, to which he was appointed on 12 August 1912, he was a member of the Executive Council headed by Sir Hamilton Goold-Adams, and an ex-officio member of the Legislative Council.

Tanganyika

Alison Russell was Chief Justice of Tanganyika from 1924 to 1929.
In a personal letter to Sir Harry Luke of 24 February 1926 he wrote "... I am going down the Congo, I hope + out at Matadi. Leaving Kigoma at the beginning of May – it takes about six weeks from Kigoma to Antwerp….I have never been to Haarlem..."
He was knighted on 6 March 1928.

The first governor of Tanganyika under the British mandate was Sir Horace Byatt, who started to give the chiefs greater involvement in the administration.
The new policy was fully endorsed by his successor Donald Cameron, who decided to remove the power of the High Court to review native court decisions.
Sir Alison Russell cooperated with implementation of indirect rule, but considered that the High Court's right to revise native court decisions was essential. 
He clashed with Cameron over this issue, and eventually resigned over it.

Malta and Northern Rhodesia

Alison Russell was Legal Adviser to the Governor of Malta before being assigned to a commission of inquiry in Northern Rhodesia (today's Zambia).
In Malta he was charged with examining into the work of the Courts. 
This resulted in an ordinance that reformed the court procedures to reduce delays in disposal of cases, and legislation that made the native language of the island, Maltese, the language of the courts wherever possible.

In late May 1935 there was a gathering of striking Bemba miners outside the offices of the Roan Antelope copper mine in Luanshya District, Northern Rhodesia.
The police fired at random into the miners and their supporters.
Six people were killed and 22 wounded.
The governor, Hubert Winthrop Young formed a commission led by Alison Russell to report on the reason for the disturbances.
The conclusion was that it was due to a tax increase that had been announced to the miners abruptly and without explanation.
The commission did not question the tax increase itself, but reformers asked what the Africans received in return for the tax.

Later career

In March 1938 Alison Russell was named a member of the Palestine Commission, chaired by Sir John Woodhead.
It was to visit Palestine and study the question of partition.
Later Alison Russell was Assistant Legal Adviser at the Colonial Office.
He was head of a commission that reported on disturbances in the Bahamas in the summer of 1942.
The Alison Russell Commission found that the 1 June 1942 riot in Nassau by 2,000 Black laborers was not related to race, but was about economic issues.
It recommended that in place of tariffs on food and supplies from the United States, the government should introduce an income tax which would raise government revenues from the wealthier inhabitants. It also recommended introduction of a secret ballot, improved access to birth control and economic stimulus measures.

In the 1943 King's Birthday Honours List Alison Russell was appointed K.C.M.G., for services to the Colonial Office.
He died in 1948.

Publications

Notes

Citations

Sources

1875 births
1948 deaths
Chief justices of Tanzania
Knights Commander of the Order of St Michael and St George
Colonial Legal Service officers